King's Mouth: Music and Songs is the fifteenth studio album by experimental rock band The Flaming Lips. It was released on Record Store Day on April 13, 2019 as a limited run of 4,000 gold-coloured records for the event. An official commercial version was released on July 19, 2019.

King's Mouth is a concept album that was conceived as the soundtrack to an art exhibit of the same name by frontman Wayne Coyne, which opened in 2017. The album features Mick Jones of The Clash providing narration on several tracks.

Critical reception 

On Metacritic, King's Mouth received a score of 74 out of 100 based on 22 reviews, indicating "generally favorable" reception. In a review for AllMusic, Heather Phares stated that the album "boasts enough beautiful music and striking imagery to make it well worth hearing". Writing for NME, Mark Beaumont called the album the band's most "playful, cinematic and cohesive" album since 2002's Yoshimi Battles the Pink Robots. Chris Ingalls of PopMatters rated the album 8 out of 10 stars and described it as a "strange, compelling head trip of an album". Reviewing the album for Consequence of Sound, David Sackllah characterized King's Mouth as a "return to form" for the band. Jeremy Winograd of Slant Magazine said the album was a "partial return to form" for the band, calling it an album of "heartwarming melodies set to hit-and-miss lyrics".

Track listing

Charts

References 

2019 albums
The Flaming Lips albums
Warner Records albums
Concept albums
Rock operas
Record Store Day releases
Albums recorded at Tarbox Road Studios